Héctor Islas Mendoza (born September 8, 1967) is a Mexican football manager and former player.

References

1967 births
Living people
Mexican footballers
Association football midfielders
Club América footballers
C.F. Cobras de Querétaro players
Cruz Azul footballers
Atlético Morelia players
Liga MX players
Mexican football managers
Footballers from Mexico City